Glyphidopeza is a genus of flies in the family Empididae.

Species
G. fluviatlis Sinclair, 1997
G. longicornis Sinclair, 1997

References

Empidoidea genera
Empididae